Joker Is is a defunct Norwegian manufacturer of ice cream that was bought by Drammens Is in 1991. For many years the company was owned by the Nidar Group and eventually Nora Industrier, then from 1988 by the brothers Jan Erik Hokstad and Einar Hokstad. Drammens Is discarded the brand after they purchased the company. Joker Is had production and head offices in Trondheim.

References

Food and drink companies of Norway
Ice cream brands
Norwegian brands
Companies based in Trondheim
Food and drink companies disestablished in 1991